The Diamond Historic District is a  area in downtown East Liverpool, Ohio. It is located at Market and East Sixth Streets. The area is triangular and is bounded by three roads. The resulting area is known as "The Diamond".

"The Diamond" (pictured), erected by George Gaston in 1884, was the first four-story brick building in East Liverpool and is located in this district.

The district was added to the National Register of Historic Places in November 1985.

References

Queen Anne architecture in Ohio
East Liverpool, Ohio
Historic districts in Columbiana County, Ohio
National Register of Historic Places in Columbiana County, Ohio
Historic districts on the National Register of Historic Places in Ohio